The Guildhall is a town hall and community building in the town of Chard in the English county of Somerset.

History
The Guildhall was built in 1834-35 to replace the town's original 16th century guildhall and market house. Owing to the inconvenient position of the original hall at Fore Street, the decision to erect a replacement was finalised in 1833. The foundation stone of the new hall was laid on 20 December 1834, and the building first opened on 21 September 1835. Designed by the local architect Richard Carver of Taunton in the Classical style, it originally incorporated a town hall, market house and butchery, and had cost over £3,000 to build. The guildhall clock was installed to celebrate the accession of Queen Victoria to the throne in 1837. The building has been Grade II* listed since 1950.

Much of the building's interior was remodelled around 1970, with the entire building later undergoing renovation work between 1998 and 2003.

The guildhall was the meeting place of the municipal borough of Chard, formed in response to the Municipal Corporations Act 1835. It ceased to be the local seat of government when, following further local government re-organisation, the enlarged South Somerset Council was formed in 1974. The Guildhall has housed the offices of Chard Town Council since 2009, and is also regularly used by local community groups for a variety of activities.

The mechanism for the guildhall clock, weighing , was removed during the renovation of the building and returned, fully restored, in spring 2008.

Architecture
The Guildhall is built of Hamstone sourced from nearby Ham Hill, with slate roofs. The two-storey building has a T-shaped plan and is designed in the Classical style. The facade features a Doric portico with a double row of Tuscan columns at ground level and Doric columns on the second-storey. A domed cupola, featuring clock faces on three sides, sits on top of the facade's pediment. Both the council chamber and mayor's parlour survive unaltered.

References

Chard, Somerset
Grade II* listed buildings in South Somerset
Guildhalls in the United Kingdom
Grade II* listed government buildings
Hamstone buildings
City and town halls in Somerset
Government buildings completed in 1834